Ivan Castiglia (born 6 January 1988) is an Italian footballer who plays for Serie D club Giulianova.

Club career
Castiglia returned to Reggina from Cittadella in the winter transfer season of 2010.

On 31 August 2013 he was re-signed by Vicenza.

At the beginning of the 2014–15 season plays for Salernitana; in January 2015 goes to Como. In the summer of 2015 he moved to Catania. The following year signing for the Robur Siena.

References

External links
 Reggina player profile

External links
 FIGC 
 

1988 births
Sportspeople from Cosenza
Living people
Reggina 1914 players
Italian footballers
Italy under-21 international footballers
Association football midfielders
L.R. Vicenza players
A.S. Cittadella players
U.S. Catanzaro 1929 players
U.S. Salernitana 1919 players
Como 1907 players
Catania S.S.D. players
A.C.N. Siena 1904 players
U.S. Triestina Calcio 1918 players
A.S.D. Città di Giulianova 1924 players
Serie A players
Serie B players
Serie C players
Serie D players
Footballers from Calabria